Sembene! is a 2015 documentary film focusing on the life of Senegalese filmmaker Ousmane Sembène, who is considered to be the father of African cinema. It is co-directed by Samba Gadjigo and Jason Silverman. The film's world premiere took place at the Sundance Film Festival in January 2015. It also played at the Cannes Film Festival and the Venice Film Festival.

Synopsis 

Sembene! tells the story of the self-taught novelist and filmmaker Ousmane Sembène, provided by Gadjigo, who wrote Sembene's biography. Sembène transitioned from a laborer into a powerful spokesman for Africa.

Critical response 
Sembene! has a 95% positive Tomato Rating based on 19 reviews. It was included on the top ten list of 2015 by Bilge Ebiri of New York Magazine, who described the film as "a testament not just to the love of movies, but also to the power of movies." Chaz Ebert listed the film as the eighth favorite in her summary of films from 2015, "Listening From My Heart: 16 Films to Remember."

References

Documentary films about African cinema
2015 films
2015 documentary films